Mohan Kumar N  is a young folk artiste and writer Mohan Kumar N has documented around a thousand folk songs, especially Kadu Gollara, Kolata, Gane and Sobana Padagalu over the last decade, and is also teaching it to students across the state. He had worked with musicians such as Hamsalekha, Arjun Janya, V.Manohar, Vasu Dixit and other popular music directors.

References

Kannada people
Living people
People from Tumkur
Year of birth missing (living people)
Indian male folk singers